Chiranjeev Rao Yadav is an Indian politician and MLA in the Haryana Legislative Assembly. He was elected to the Rewari assembly constituency in the 2019 election as a member of the Indian National Congress (INC). Chiranjeev is a son of former minister in Government of Haryana Ajay Singh Yadav.

References

People from Rewari district
Indian National Congress politicians
Living people
1970 births